is a horror television series based on the popular Japanese film series One Missed Call. It aired on TV Asahi in 2005.

Synopsis
Yumi (Rei Kikukawa), a writer of a science magazine, witnesses a mysterious death of a high school girl who received a "one missed call" from her own cell phone, two weeks in the future. The disturbing message on the cell phone turns out to be the screams of the victim.

Cast

External links
 

2005 Japanese television series debuts
2005 Japanese television series endings
Japanese horror fiction television series
One Missed Call
Live action television shows based on films
Fiction about curses
Works about mobile phones
TV Asahi television dramas